Zoltán Bubonyi (1935-2017), was a male international table tennis player from Hungary.

Table tennis career
He won a silver medal at the 1959 World Table Tennis Championships in the Swaythling Cup (men's team event) for Hungary with Zoltán Berczik, László Földy, László Pigniczki and Ferenc Sidó.

He also won three European Table Tennis Championships medals (two of which were gold). He represented Hungary on 18 occasions from 1957 to 1960.

See also
 List of table tennis players
 List of World Table Tennis Championships medalists

References

Hungarian male table tennis players
1935 births
2017 deaths
World Table Tennis Championships medalists